Chinchón (possibly from Quechua chinchu a plant of the Tagetes family, -n a suffix) is a mountain in the western part of the Chila mountain range in the Andes of Peru, about  high. It lies in the Arequipa Region, Castilla Province,  Chachas District. Chinchón is situated southwest of Huayta and southeast of Aceruta.

References 

Mountains of Peru
Mountains of Arequipa Region